Trickster: Native American Tales, A Graphic Collection is an anthology of Native American stories in the format of graphic novels. Published in 2010 and edited by Matt Dembicki, Trickster contains twenty-one short stories, all told by Indigenous storytellers from many different native nations. The premise of each short story is to teach a moral lesson or explain how certain natural events happen. All stories contained within the anthology are tales that have been told orally for centuries within Native American tribes. As the title of the collection suggests, each story contains a character that is known and depicted as a Trickster. This character is the main focus of the story and is typically depicted as an animal figure. Many of the tales such as, Coyote and the Pebbles and Rabbit and the Tug-of-War depict the trickster in a more well-known form of a coyote or rabbit. Lesser known characters are depicted as the trickster throughout the remaining stories such as the raven in Raven the Trickster and the racoon in Espun and Grandfather.

Although each story within the collection is a Native tale, most of the illustrations were done by a non-native artist. The style of each graphic novel ranges from realistic to child-like illustrations, to detailed paintings. Due to these unique differences in illustration styles, Matt Dembicki worried about the cultural origins of some stories getting lost in the artwork. To prevent this ‘westernization’ of the Indigenous tales, illustrations were preapproved by the storytellers as to not have the overall motif distorted.



Indigenous graphic novels 
Starting in the 1800s, political cartoons were utilized to further dehumanize Indigenous peoples of North America. The graphic novel format reclaims the art form while simultaneously challenging negative stereotypes depicted in media and providing positive representation for native youth. Background on the writers and illustrators are provided in the "Contributors" section at the end of the novel, but are not always noted within the content of the story.

Other indigenous graphic novel anthologies include Moonshot: The Indigenous Comics Collection, edited by Hope Nicholson, Stories of Our People: A Métis Graphic Novel Anthology, edited by Norman Fleury, Deer Woman: An Anthology, edited by Elizabeth LaPensée and Weshoyot Alvitre, Sovereign Traces, Volume 1: Not (Just) (An)Other, edited by Gordon D. Henry Jr. and Elizabeth LaPensée, and Tales of the Mighty Code Talkers, edited by Arigon Starr.

Short stories

References 

Native American literature
Comics anthologies
2010 books